The following lists events that happened during 1978 in Finland.

Incumbents
 President: Urho Kekkonen
 Prime Minister: Kalevi Sorsa

Events
 2 January – At 1978 IIHF European U18 Championship final game, the Finnish ice hockey defeats Russia.
 15–16 January  – 1978 Finnish presidential election
 18–26 February  – FIS Nordic World Ski Championships 1978 are held in Lahti.
 1 July – Finland establishes diplomatic relations with Botswana.
 29 August–3 September – Finland sends 33 athletes to the 1978 European Athletics Championships.
 30 September – Finnair Flight 405 aircraft is hijacked by Aarno Lamminparras in Oulu, Finland.
 13 October – Poet and Muse drama film is released.

Full date unknown
Nuorallatanssijan kuolema eli kuinka Pete Q sai siivet, Finnish rock musical is performed.

Births
 19 January – Laura Närhi, pop singer
 28 February – Mikko Innanen, saxophonist and composer
 1 March – Pete Seppälä, singer
 8 March – Taneli Tikka, entrepreneur and IT influencer
 21 April – 
Jukka Nevalainen, drummer, musician
Paleface (birth name Karri Pekka Matias Miettinen), hip hop musician
 11 May – Perttu Kivilaakso, cello player
 12 June – Mikko Lehtonen, ice hockey player
 24 June – Emppu Vuorinen, guitarist, songwriter
 19 July – Ilpo Larha, Finnish criminal.
 17 August – Jaani Peuhu, musician, producer, and songwriter
 22 September – Mikko Leppilampi, actor, musician, and TV host
 23 September – Valtteri Laurell Pöyhönen, jazz guitarist, pianist, composer, bandleader and producer
 24 November – Susanna Majuri, fine art photographer (died 2020)
 28 December – Janita (Janita Maria (née Raukko), Finnish-born, American singer-songwriter

Full date unknown
 Nopsajalka (birth name Antti Ilmari Hakala), musician and producer

Deaths

 13 March – Kaare Bache, triple jumper
 28 March – Karl Lennart Oesch, World War II general (born 1892)

References

Works cited
 

 
1970s in Finland
Finland
Finland
Years of the 20th century in Finland